Eutropia  (died after 325), a woman of Syrian origin, was the wife of Emperor Maximian.

Marriage to Maximian and their children 
In the late 3rd century, she married Maximian, though the exact date of this marriage is uncertain. By Maximian, she had two children, a boy, Maxentius (c. 280–312), who was Western Roman Emperor from 306 to 312 and a girl, Fausta (c. 290), who was wife of Constantine the Great, and mother of six children by him, including the Augusti Constantine II, Constantius II and Constans.

Another daughter? 
There is some doubt as to whether Flavia Maximiana Theodora, who married Constantius I Chlorus, was a daughter of Eutropia by an earlier husband, Afranius Hannibalianus or whether she was a daughter of Maximian by an earlier anonymous wife.

Footnotes

References 
 s.v. DiMaio, Michael, "Maximianus Herculius (286-305 A.D)", DIR
 Barnes, Timothy D. The New Empire of Diocletian and Constantine. Cambridge, MA: Harvard University Press, 1982. 

3rd-century Roman empresses
4th-century Roman empresses
3rd-century births
4th-century deaths
Romans from unknown gentes